The 2008 TCU Horned Frogs football team represented Texas Christian University in the 2008 NCAA Division I FBS football season. The team was coached by Gary Patterson. The Frogs played their home games at Amon G. Carter Stadium, which is located on campus in Fort Worth. The Horned Frogs finished the season 11–2, 7–1 in conference, and won the Poinsettia Bowl against #9 Boise State, 17–16.

Schedule

** Game was moved to an earlier start time due to Hurricane Ike

Rankings

Note that superscript values are not official (below number 25) but are based on number of votes received in the various polls.

References

TCU
TCU Horned Frogs football seasons
Poinsettia Bowl champion seasons
TCU Horned Frogs football